Respimat, also known as Respimat Soft Mist Inhaler, is a drug delivery device used for the treatment of asthma, chronic obstructive pulmonary disease (COPD), and other respiratory conditions.

Its developer, Boehringer Ingelheim, is currently conducting approved in the U.S. with a variety of their products, such as tiotropium and ipratropium/salbutamol.  According to the manufacturer, the reusability of the inhaler reduces its carbon footprint by 71%.

References

Sources
 Home — Respimat International

Drug delivery devices
Medical treatments